Hartwell may refer to:

Places
 Hartwell, Victoria, a neighbourhood of Camberwell in Melbourne, Australia
 Hartwell railway station

England 
 Hartwell, Buckinghamshire
 Hartwell, Northamptonshire, a village
 Hartwell, Staffordshire, a location

United States 
 Hartwell, Arkansas, a place in Arkansas
 Hartwell, Cincinnati, Ohio, a neighborhood
 Hartwell, Georgia, a city
 Hartwell Railroad
 Hartwell, Indiana, an unincorporated community
 Hartwell, Missouri

Other uses
 Hartwell (surname)
 Hartwell (1787 ship), 18th Century East Indiaman
 Hartwell Mutiny, on the above
 Hartwell Tavern, structure in Massachusetts

See also
 Michael Berry, Baron Hartwell
 Hartwell baronets
 Hartnell
 Harwell (disambiguation)